Rabiea is a genus of flowering plants belonging to the family Aizoaceae.

It is native to the Cape Provinces and Free State within South Africa.

The genus name of Rabiea is in honour of William Abbot Rabie (1869–1936), a South African clergyman and plant collector. 
It was first described and published in Gard. Chron., series 3, Vol.88 on page 279 in 1930.

Known species
According to Kew:
Rabiea albinota 
Rabiea albipuncta 
Rabiea comptonii 
Rabiea difformis 
Rabiea jamesii 
Rabiea lesliei

References

Aizoaceae
Aizoaceae genera
Plants described in 1930
Flora of the Cape Provinces
Flora of the Free State
Taxa named by N. E. Brown